German searchlights of the Second World War were used to detect and track enemy aircraft at night. They were used in three main sizes, 60, 150 and 200 centimetres. After the end of the First World War, German development of searchlights was effectively stopped by the Treaty of Versailles, it resumed in 1927. At the outset of the war, searchlights were combined with acoustic direction-finders, with the direction-finders guiding the searchlights to the right part of the sky, where they swept until they found the target. Later in the war, the searchlights were radar-directed. The searchlights used extremely high-powered Carbon Arc lamps.

60 Centimetre

These were developed in the late 1930s, with a  diameter parabolic glass reflector and was powered by an 8 kilowatt generator. It required a crew of three and could be transported using a single axle Special trailer 51. One of the crew operated the searchlight, another operated the generator, and the third was the section commander. Naval versions of the searchlight included a shutter, to allow them to be used for Morse signaling.

The searchlight was controlled in azimuth and altitude by two, hand-operated cranks. The searchlight operator also had a foot-switch that operated a lamp on the generator. He could use this to send simple Morse signals to the generator operator, requesting, for example, more or less power. The searchlight included a sophisticated system to control the carbon arc lamp, extending the carbon electrodes to keep a constant arc distance as the ends of the electrodes burned away.

The 8 kilowatt, direct current generator that powered the searchlight was driven by a six-cylinder, BMW engine, of a type used in pre-war cars.

Typical tactics were to sweep the search light in an S-shaped pattern along the targets' expected course with the beam dispersed, once the target was detected, it was then tracked using the focused beam.

The 60 cm searchlights were not powerful enough to reach the allied bomber streams later in the war, so were typically employed organically with 20 mm and 37 mm low-level flak guns.

150 Centimetre

Developed in the late 1930s, the Flakscheinwerfer (Flak Searchlight) 34 and 37 used  diameter parabolic glass reflectors with an output of 990 million candelas. The system was powered by a 24-kilowatt generator, based around a 51-horsepower (38 kW) 8-cylinder engine, giving a current of 200 amperes at 110 volts. The searchlight was attached to the generator by a  cable. The system could be made mobile using two sets of Special Trailer 104 units, one for the searchlight and one for the generator. It required a crew of seven to operate it.

The searchlight could be traversed 360 degrees and elevated from -12 degrees through the vertical to -12 degrees on the other side.

Early war tactics for the searchlight deployment had the searchlights forward of the Flak guns in a "zone of preparation", laid out in a grid with 5 kilometers between each light. Sound locators deployed with the searchlights helped them find targets, later these were replaced with radar systems.

Sixty-one special fixed quadruple 150-centimetre mounts were produced in an effort to extend the range of the 150 centimetre searchlights, however these proved unsuccessful.

200 Centimetre
In order to reach bombers now flying at increasingly higher altitudes, more powerful searchlights were needed. In 1943, the first 200-centimetre Scheinwerfer-43 searchlights, with 2.7 billion Hefner candlepower (2.4 gigacandela) were delivered to troops.

Typically, one 200 cm searchlight was employed with three 150 cm searchlights. The 200 cm searchlight was deployed at the center of a triangle formed by the 150 cm searchlights. The master searchlight would find the target, and the 150 cm lights would cone the target, providing solid triangulation.

Obsolete and captured searchlights
A few obsolete 110 centimetre searchlights and captured French 200 cm and 240 cm searchlights were also used.

German searchlight inventory
In September 1940, excluding units emplaced at naval facilities, Germany had 2,540 searchlights (60 cm and 150 cm). During the war, this number grew rapidly — by February 1944, the Quartermaster General of the Luftwaffe General Staff reported that stocks of floodlights were as follows:

References
Citations

Bibliography
 Anti-aircraft artillery, Ian V Hogg, 
 TM-E 30-451 Handbook on German Military Forces, 15 March 1945, US War Department

See also

Anti-aircraft weapons
searchlights
Wehrmacht